The Billboard Music Award for Top Social Artist is one of three fan-voted categories in the award show. It is awarded based on major fan interactions with music including streaming and social engagement, together with the global online voting results.

The award was first won in 2011 by Justin Bieber, who is the most nominated artist in the category with eight nominations, followed by Ariana Grande with seven, BTS with five, while Rihanna and Taylor Swift each have four. Bieber is also the most awarded nominee with six consecutive wins. His winning streak was broken as of the 2017 ceremony by BTS, who were the first K-pop group ever to be nominated for and win a Billboard Music Award. They have won the award for five consecutive years.

Winners and nominees

References

Billboard awards